Argles is a surname, and may refer to:

 Marsham Argles (1814–1892), Anglican clergyman
 Harold Arthur Argles (1899–1929), member, personnel of the Shackleton–Rowett Expedition
 Frank Atkinson Argles, High Sheriff of Westmorland
 Theodore Argles (1851–1886), Australian journalist
 Thomas Atkinson Argles, High Sheriff of Westmorland

See also
 Argle (disambiguation)